Álvaro Gijón (born 27 April 1976) is a Spanish cross-country skier. He competed in the men's 10 kilometre classical event at the 1998 Winter Olympics.

References

1976 births
Living people
Spanish male cross-country skiers
Olympic cross-country skiers of Spain
Cross-country skiers at the 1998 Winter Olympics
Sportspeople from Granada